Enrique Mata Cabello (born 15 June 1985 in Burgos) is a Spanish cyclist. He rode in the 2010 Vuelta a España and finished in 121st place.

Palmarès
2005
1st Stage 2 Vuelta a Navarra
2008
3rd Circuito de Getxo
2010
6th Circuito de Getxo
8th Vattenfall Cyclassics

References

1985 births
Living people
Spanish male cyclists
Sportspeople from Burgos
Cyclists from Castile and León